Narodna knjiga–Alfa is a Serbian publisher. It is one of the leading publishing houses in Serbia.

References 

Publishing companies of Serbia